Karanja may refer to:

Places
 Karanja Lad, a city in Washim, Maharashtra
 Karanja, Wardha, a tehsil in Maharashtra
 Karanja, Raigad, a town in Maharashtra
 Karanja, Bangladesh
 Karanja Assembly constituency, constituency of the Maharashtra Legislative Assembly

Other uses
 SS Karanja
 Karanja oil, an oil made from seeds of Millettia pinnata